Nicola Delli Santi (born 4 April 1970) is an Italian equestrian. He competed in the team eventing at the 1996 Summer Olympics.

References

1970 births
Living people
Italian male equestrians
Olympic equestrians of Italy
Equestrians at the 1996 Summer Olympics
Sportspeople from Milan